Alex Isle  is an Australian author. He writes both novels and short stories in the science fiction/fantasy genre, as well as books and articles of nonfiction, for both adult and young adult (YA) audiences.

In 2014 Isle changed his name from Susan to Alex to reflect a gender identity change and adopted the male pronouns. Publications before 2014 are under the name Sue Isle.

Isle's books include the 1996 YA novel Scale of Dragon, Tooth of Wolf, about a rebellious teen in an alternate-world 16th century joining a group of sorceresses, and nonfiction children's book Wolf Children : the real feral kids : an extraordinary story (1998), as well as a collection of post-apocalyptic stories set in Perth, "Nightsiders", published in 2011.  Isle has sold numerous stories to publications such as Aurealis, Orb, ASIM, Agog, Sword and Sorceress, Tales of the Unanticipated [USA] and Shiny, a YA fiction magazine. Isle's other interests include history, science fiction conventions, roleplay gaming, gardening and working out how best to turn his hometown into a post-apocalypse scenario.

Bibliography

Novels
Nightsiders (collection of theme fiction) (2011)
Scale of Dragon, Tooth of Wolf (1996)
Wolf Children (1998)

Short fiction
"To Here the Midnight Fled" in Thyme Fiction 2(1989?)
"Her Father's Daughter" (1990) in Sword And Sorceress VII (ed. Marion Zimmer Bradley)
"Nightwings" (1990) in Aurealis #1 (ed. Stephen Higgins, Dirk Strasser)
"The Last Guardian" (1990) in Glass Reptile Breakout and other Australian Speculative Stories (ed. Van Ikin)
"Remembering Names" (1991) in Aurealis #4 (ed. Stephen Higgins, Dirk Strasser)
"A Sprig of Aconite" (1992) in Intimate Armageddons (ed. Bill Congreve)
"Daybreak" (1992) in Aurealis #8 (ed. Stephen Higgins, Dirk Strasser)
"Makeover" (1993) in Terror Australis: The Best of Australian Horror (ed. Leigh Blackmore)
"Kill Me Once" (1994) in Alien Shores : An Anthology of Australian Science Fiction (ed. Peter McNamara, Margaret Winch)
"A Sky Full of Ravens" (1995) in She's Fantastical
"Ice Harvest" (1995) in Aurealis #16 (ed. Stephen Higgins, Dirk Strasser)
"Chadriki Dance" (1998) in Tales of the Unanticipated, August 1998 (ed. Eric M. Heideman)
"Habits of Empire" (1998) in Aurealis #20/21 (ed. Stephen Higgins, Dirk Strasser)
"Sisterchild" (1999) in Orb Speculative Fiction #0 (ed. Sarah Endacott)
"The Woman of Endor" (2001) in Orb Speculative Fiction #2 (ed. Sarah Endacott)
"Life and a Chance" (2001) in Tales of the Unanticipated #22 (ed. Eric M. Heideman)
"Amy's Stars" (2003) in Orb Speculative Fiction #5 (ed. Sarah Endacott)
"Catbones" (2003) in Andromeda Spaceways Inflight Magazine, Issue #5 (ed. Danuta Shaw)
"Witness of Blood" (2003) in Agog! Terrific Tales (ed. Cat Sparks)
"Doing Shadow Time" (2003) in Southern Blood: New Australian Tales of the Supernatural (ed. Bill Congreve)
"Dog Years" (2004) in Aurealis #32 (ed. Keith Stevenson
"Mary Bennet Goes Postal" (2005) in Tales of the Unanticipated #26 (ed. Eric M. Heideman)
"Daughter of the Red Cranes" (2006) in Agog! Ripping Reads (ed. Cat Sparks)
"Mary Bennet Gets a Life" (2006) in Borderlands #7
"The Sun People" (2007) Shiny (magazine) #2 (ed. Alisa Krasnostein)
"Heartsblood" (2008) in Tales of the Unanticipated #29 (ed. Eric M. Heideman)
"I Can Run Faster" (2008) in Aurealis #41 (ed. Stuart Mayne)
"Paper Dragons" Shiny August 2008
"Candle to the Devil"  [New Ceres Nights} 2009 Twelfth Planet Press
"Nightsiders" [collection of short fiction by Sue Isle] 2011 by Twelfth Planet Press
Mars Peacemaker" in Review of Australian Fiction (2013)
"The Kind Neighbours of Hell" (2014) in Use Only As Directed (ed. Simon Petrie, Edwina Harvey)

Some of these stories may be found at:
https://curiousfictions.com/authors/503-alex-isle

Articles
Dogs Who Are Wolves (1998) in School Magazine Reprinted 2016.
Worldcon (2000) in Write Away Magazine (Fremantle Arts Centre)
The Wolf Girls (2001) in School Magazine
Roleplaying for Authors (2001) in Write Away Magazine
Why Science Fiction Isn't Scary (2002) in Write Away Magazine
Kept by Rats (2002) in Pets, Vets and People
A Person, More or Less Wicked (2003 in Fables and Reflections Easter 2003

Awards and nominations
Aurealis Awards
Best fantasy short story
2001: Win: "The Woman of Endor"
Best horror short story
2003: Nomination: "Amy's Stars"
Best science fiction short story
2003: Nomination: "Amy's Stars"

Ditmar Awards
Best short fiction
1996: Nomination: "A Sky Full of Ravens"
Best short story
2008: Nomination: "The Sun People"

References

External links

Date of birth missing (living people)
Living people
Australian fantasy writers
Australian science fiction writers
20th-century Australian male writers
Australian male short story writers
21st-century Australian male writers
Transgender writers
Australian LGBT novelists
People from Fremantle

Year of birth missing (living people)
21st-century LGBT people